Cesario Gussago (fl. 1599-1612) was an Italian priest, musician and composer of the late Renaissance era. He studied philosophy and theology at the University of Pavia and served as church organist in Brescia at Santa Maria della Grazia. In 1599 he was Vicar-General of the Order of S. Gerolamo in Brescia. In 1608 he published a collection of sonatas in the canzona style of the late 16th century, titled Sonate a quattro sei et otto.

Works
Selected works include: 

1. La Cornala a4
2. La Fontana a4
3. La Faustinella a4
4. La Rizza a4
5. La Schilina a4
6. La Mallonia a4
7. La Squizzerotta a4
8. La Bottana a4
9. La Zonta a4
10. La Nicolina a4
11. La Marina a6
12. L'Angioletta a6
13. La Badina a6
14. La Facca a6
15. L'Onofria a8
16. La Tonina a8
17. La Terza a8
18. La Porcelaga a8
19. La Leona a8
20. La Luzzara a8
21. Anima mea liquefacta est a 8
22. Fili ego Salomon a 8
23. Ad te Domine levavi a 8
24. Confitebor tibi Domine a 8
25. Exultavit cor meum in Domino a 8
26. Cantemus Domino a 8
27. Salvum me fac Deus a 8
28. Confitemini Domino a 8

References

External links
 http://imslp.org/wiki/Category:Gussago,_Cesario
 http://www.gardane.info/gardane_compositori.php?autore_id=465
 https://web.archive.org/web/20160304052110/https://onedrive.live.com/?cid=7C9129D365E25EBE&id=7C9129D365E25EBE!14243
 https://digital.library.adelaide.edu.au/dspace/handle/2440/19556
 http://www.sheetmusicplus.com/search1?Ntt=gussago

Renaissance composers
Italian classical composers
Italian male classical composers
16th-century births
17th-century deaths
Italian musicians